The following is a partial list of the "D" codes for Medical Subject Headings (MeSH), as defined by the United States National Library of Medicine (NLM).

This list continues the information at List of MeSH codes (D12.125). Codes following these are found at List of MeSH codes (D12.776). For other MeSH codes, see List of MeSH codes.

The source for this content is the set of 2006 MeSH Trees from the NLM.

– peptides

– antimicrobial cationic peptides

  – defensins
  – alpha defensins
  – beta defensins

– aptamers, peptide

– charybdotoxin

– cholecystokinin

  – sincalide

– diazepam binding inhibitor

– disintegrins

– distamycins

– edeine

– fibrinopeptide a

– fibrinopeptide b

– glycopeptides

  – acetylmuramyl-alanyl-isoglutamine
  – bleomycin
  – peplomycin
  – phleomycins
  – peptidoglycan
  – ristocetin
  – sialoglycoproteins
  – antigens, cd43
  – glycophorin
  – teicoplanin
  – vancomycin

– intercellular signaling peptides and proteins

  – angiogenic proteins
  – angiopoietins
  – angiopoietin-1
  – angiopoietin-2
  – angiostatic proteins
  – angiostatins
  – endostatins
  – vascular endothelial growth factors
  – vascular endothelial growth factor a
  – vascular endothelial growth factor b
  – vascular endothelial growth factor c
  – vascular endothelial growth factor d
  – vascular endothelial growth factor, endocrine-gland-derived
  – cytokines
  – autocrine motility factor
  – chemokines
  – beta-thromboglobulin
  – chemokines, c
  – chemokines, cc
  – chemokines, cxc
  – chemokines, cx3c
  – interleukin-8
  – macrophage inflammatory proteins
  – macrophage inflammatory protein-1
  – monocyte chemoattractant proteins
  – monocyte chemoattractant protein-1
  – platelet factor 4
  – rantes
  – growth substances
  – hematopoietic cell growth factors
  – colony-stimulating factors
  – colony-stimulating factors, recombinant
  – granulocyte colony stimulating factor, recombinant
  – filgrastim
  – granulocyte macrophage colony-stimulating factors, recombinant
  – erythropoietin
  – erythropoietin, recombinant
  – epoetin alfa
  – granulocyte colony-stimulating factor
  – granulocyte colony stimulating factor, recombinant
  – filgrastim
  – granulocyte-macrophage colony-stimulating factor
  – granulocyte macrophage colony-stimulating factors, recombinant
  – interleukin-3
  – macrophage colony-stimulating factor
  – thrombopoietin
  – stem cell factor
  – interleukins
  – interleukin-1
  – interleukin-2
  – interleukin-3
  – interleukin-4
  – interleukin-5
  – interleukin-6
  – interleukin-7
  – interleukin-8
  – interleukin-9
  – interleukin-10
  – interleukin-11
  – interleukin-12
  – interleukin-13
  – interleukin-14
  – interleukin-15
  – interleukin-16
  – interleukin-17
  – interleukin-18
  – transforming growth factor beta
  – hepatocyte growth factor
  – interferons
  – interferon type i
  – interferon type i, recombinant
  – interferon alfa-2a
  – interferon alfa-2b
  – interferon alfa-2c
  – interferon-alpha
  – interferon alfa-2a
  – interferon alfa-2b
  – interferon alfa-2c
  – interferon-beta
  – interferon type ii
  – interferon-gamma, recombinant
  – lymphokines
  – interferon type ii
  – interleukin-2
  – leukocyte migration-inhibitory factors
  – lymphotoxin
  – macrophage-activating factors
  – interferon type ii
  – macrophage migration-inhibitory factors
  – neuroleukin
  – suppressor factors, immunologic
  – transfer factor
  – monokines
  – interleukin-1
  – tumor necrosis factor-alpha
  – tumor necrosis factors
  – lymphotoxin
  – tumor necrosis factor-alpha
  – endothelial growth factors
  – endothelins
  – endothelin-1
  – endothelin-2
  – endothelin-3
  – ephrins
  – ephrin-A1
  – ephrin-A2
  – ephrin-A3
  – ephrin-A4
  – ephrin-A5
  – ephrin-b1
  – ephrin-b2
  – ephrin-b3
  – epidermal growth factor
  – fibroblast growth factors
  – fibroblast growth factor 1
  – fibroblast growth factor 2
  – fibroblast growth factor 3
  – fibroblast growth factor 4
  – fibroblast growth factor 5
  – fibroblast growth factor 6
  – fibroblast growth factor 7
  – fibroblast growth factor 8
  – fibroblast growth factor 9
  – fibroblast growth factor 10
  – i-kappa b kinase
  – kinins
  – bradykinin
  – kallidin
  – kininogens
  – kininogen, high-molecular-weight
  – kininogen, low-molecular-weight
  – tachykinins
  – eledoisin
  – kassinin
  – neurokinin a
  – neurokinin b
  – physalaemin
  – substance p
  – neuregulins
  – neuregulin-1
  – parathyroid hormone-related protein
  – platelet-derived growth factor
  – proto-oncogene proteins c-sis
  – somatomedins
  – insulin-like growth factor i
  – insulin-like growth factor ii
  – transforming growth factors
  – transforming growth factor alpha
  – transforming growth factor beta
  – tumor necrosis factors
  – lymphotoxin
  – tumor necrosis factor-alpha
  – wnt proteins
  – wnt1 protein
  – wnt2 protein

– intracellular signaling peptides and proteins

  – activating transcription factor 6
  – adaptor proteins, signal transducing
  – caveolin 1
  – caveolin 2
  – cortactin
  – crk-associated substrate protein
  – grb2 adaptor protein
  – grb7 adaptor protein
  – grb10 adaptor protein
  – interferon-stimulated gene factor 3
  – interferon-stimulated gene factor 3, alpha subunit
  – stat1 transcription factor
  – stat2 transcription factor
  – interferon-stimulated gene factor 3, gamma subunit
  – interferon regulatory factors
  – interferon regulatory factor-1
  – interferon regulatory factor-2
  – interferon regulatory factor-3
  – interferon regulatory factor-7
  – interferon-stimulated gene factor 3, gamma subunit
  – pii nitrogen regulatory proteins
  – paxillin
  – protein inhibitors of activated STAT
  – 14-3-3 proteins
  – proto-oncogene proteins c-crk
  – proto-oncogene proteins c-vav
  – smad proteins
  – smad proteins, inhibitory
  – smad6 protein
  – smad7 protein
  – smad proteins, receptor-regulated
  – smad1 protein
  – smad2 protein
  – smad3 protein
  – smad5 protein
  – smad8 protein
  – smad4 protein
  – stat transcription factors
  – stat1 transcription factor
  – stat2 transcription factor
  – stat3 transcription factor
  – stat4 transcription factor
  – stat5 transcription factor
  – stat6 transcription factor
  – suppressor of cytokine signaling proteins
  – tumor necrosis factor receptor-associated peptides and proteins
  – tnf receptor-associated factor 1
  – tnf receptor-associated factor 2
  – tnf receptor-associated factor 3
  – tnf receptor-associated factor 5
  – tnf receptor-associated factor 6
  – adenylate cyclase
  – apoptosis regulatory proteins
  – apoptosis inducing factor
  – caspases
  – caspase 1
  – inhibitor of apoptosis proteins
  – neuronal apoptosis-inhibitory protein
  – x-linked inhibitor of apoptosis protein
  – proto-oncogene proteins c-bcl-2
  – bcl-associated death protein
  – bcl-2-associated x protein
  – bcl-2 homologous antagonist-killer protein
  – bcl-x protein
  – bh3 interacting domain death agonist protein
  – ca(2+)-calmodulin dependent protein kinase
  – myosin-light-chain kinase
  – casein kinases
  – casein kinase i
  – casein kinase ialpha
  – casein kinase idelta
  – casein kinase iepsilon
  – casein kinase ii
  – cyclic nucleotide-regulated protein kinases
  – cyclic amp-dependent protein kinases
  – beta-adrenergic receptor kinase
  – cyclic gmp-dependent protein kinases
  – protamine kinase
  – cyclin-dependent kinases
  – cdc2-cdc28 kinases
  – cdc2 protein kinase
  – cdc28 protein kinase, s cerevisiae
  – cyclin-dependent kinase 5
  – cyclin-dependent kinase 9
  – cyclin-dependent kinase 2
  – cyclin-dependent kinase 4
  – cyclin-dependent kinase 6
  – maturation-promoting factor
  – cdc2 protein kinase
  – eif-2 kinase
  – focal adhesion protein-tyrosine kinases
  – glycogen synthase kinases
  – glycogen synthase kinase 3
  – gtp-binding protein regulators
  – gtpase-activating proteins
  – chimerin proteins
  – chimerin 1
  – eukaryotic initiation factor-5
  – ras gtpase-activating proteins
  – neurofibromin 1
  – p120 gtpase activating protein
  – rgs proteins
  – guanine nucleotide dissociation inhibitors
  – guanine nucleotide exchange factors
  – eukaryotic initiation factor-2b
  – guanine nucleotide-releasing factor 2
  – proto-oncogene proteins c-vav
  – ral guanine nucleotide exchange factor
  – ras guanine nucleotide exchange factors
  – ras-grf1
  – son of sevenless proteins
  – son of sevenless protein, drosophila
  – sos1 protein
  – guanylate cyclase
  – heterotrimeric gtp-binding proteins
  – gtp-binding protein alpha subunits
  – gtp-binding protein alpha subunits, g12-g13
  – gtp-binding protein alpha subunits, gi-go
  – gtp-binding protein alpha subunit, gi2
  – gtp-binding protein alpha subunits, gq-g11
  – gtp-binding protein alpha subunits, gs
  – gtp-binding protein beta subunits
  – gtp-binding protein gamma subunits
  – transducin
  – i-kappa b kinase
  – i-kappa b proteins
  – intracellular calcium-sensing proteins
  – calmodulin
  – calnexin
  – calreticulin
  – gelsolin
  – neuronal calcium-sensor proteins
  – guanylate cyclase-activating proteins
  – hippocalcin
  – Kv channel-interacting proteins
  – neurocalcin
  – recoverin
  – map kinase kinase kinases
  – map kinase kinase kinase 1
  – map kinase kinase kinase 2
  – map kinase kinase kinase 3
  – map kinase kinase kinase 4
  – map kinase kinase kinase 5
  – proto-oncogene proteins c-mos
  – raf kinases
  – oncogene proteins v-raf
  – proto-oncogene proteins b-raf
  – proto-oncogene proteins c-raf
  – mitogen-activated protein kinase kinases
  – map kinase kinase 1
  – map kinase kinase 2
  – map kinase kinase 3
  – map kinase kinase 4
  – map kinase kinase 5
  – map kinase kinase 6
  – map kinase kinase 7
  – mitogen-activated protein kinases
  – extracellular signal-regulated map kinases
  – mitogen-activated protein kinase 1
  – mitogen-activated protein kinase 3
  – mitogen-activated protein kinase 6
  – mitogen-activated protein kinase 7
  – jnk mitogen-activated protein kinases
  – mitogen-activated protein kinase 8
  – mitogen-activated protein kinase 9
  – mitogen-activated protein kinase 10
  – p38 mitogen-activated protein kinases
  – mitogen-activated protein kinase 11
  – mitogen-activated protein kinase 12
  – mitogen-activated protein kinase 13
  – mitogen-activated protein kinase 14
  – monomeric gtp-binding proteins
  – adp-ribosylation factors
  – ADP-ribosylation factor 1
  – rab gtp-binding proteins
  – rab1 gtp-binding proteins
  – rab2 gtp-binding protein
  – rab3 gtp-binding proteins
  – rab3a gtp-binding protein
  – rab4 gtp-binding proteins
  – rab5 gtp-binding proteins
  – ral gtp-binding proteins
  – ran gtp-binding protein
  – rap gtp-binding proteins
  – rap1 gtp-binding proteins
  – ras proteins
  – oncogene protein p21(ras)
  – proto-oncogene proteins p21(ras)
  – rho gtp-binding proteins
  – cdc42 gtp-binding protein
  – cdc42 gtp-binding protein, saccharomyces cerevisiae
  – rac gtp-binding proteins
  – rac1 gtp-binding protein
  – rhoa gtp-binding protein
  – rhob gtp-binding protein
  – olfactory marker protein
  – phosphatidylethanolamine binding protein
  – phospholipase c gamma
  – ribosomal protein s6 kinases
  – ribosomal protein s6 kinases, 70-kda
  – ribosomal protein s6 kinases, 90-kda

– myocardial depressant factor

– neuropeptides

  – angiotensins
  – angiotensin i
  – angiotensin ii
  – angiotensin iii
  – bombesin
  – bradykinin
  – calcitonin
  – calcitonin gene-related peptide
  – carnosine
  – cholecystokinin
  – corticotropin
  – corticotropin-releasing hormone
  – delta sleep-inducing peptide
  – fmrfamide
  – galanin
  – galanin-like peptide
  – gastric inhibitory polypeptide
  – gastrin-releasing peptide
  – gastrins
  – glucagon precursors
  – glucagon
  – gonadorelin
  – motilin
  – melanocyte-stimulating hormones
  – alpha-msh
  – beta-msh
  – gamma-msh
  – msh release-inhibiting hormone
  – msh-releasing hormone
  – neuropeptide y
  – neurophysins
  – neurotensin
  – opioid peptides
  – dynorphins
  – endorphins
  – alpha-endorphin
  – beta-endorphin
  – gamma-endorphin
  – enkephalins
  – enkephalin, ala(2)-mephe(4)-gly(5)-
  – enkephalin, leucine
  – enkephalin, methionine
  – enkephalin, d-penicillamine (2,5)-
  – pancreatic polypeptide
  – peptide phi
  – pituitary adenylate cyclase-activating polypeptide
  – pituitary hormone release inhibiting hormones
  – pituitary hormone-releasing hormones
  – prolactin release-inhibiting hormone
  – prolactin-releasing hormone
  – thyrotropin-releasing hormone
  – secretin
  – somatostatin
  – somatotropin-releasing hormone
  – tachykinins
  – eledoisin
  – kassinin
  – neurokinin a
  – neurokinin b
  – physalaemin
  – substance p
  – vasoactive intestinal peptide
  – vasopressins
  – argipressin
  – lypressin
  – oxytocin
  – vasotocin

– oligopeptides

  – amanitins
  – angiotensins
  – angiotensin i
  – angiotensin ii
  – angiotensin amide
  – saralasin
  – 1-sarcosine-8-isoleucine angiotensin ii
  – angiotensin iii
  – angiotensinogen
  – antipain
  – bradykinin
  – kallidin
  – caerulein
  – chalones
  – delta sleep-inducing peptide
  – dipeptides
  – anserine
  – aspartame
  – carnosine
  – enalapril
  – enalaprilat
  – glycylglycine
  – lisinopril
  – n-formylmethionine leucyl-phenylalanine
  – glutathione
  – glutathione disulfide
  – s-nitrosoglutathione
  – gonadorelin
  – buserelin
  – goserelin
  – leuprolide
  – nafarelin
  – triptorelin
  – leupeptins
  – netropsin
  – pentagastrin
  – pepstatins
  – peptichemio
  – peptide t
  – phalloidine
  – thyrotropin-releasing hormone
  – tachykinins
  – eledoisin
  – kassinin
  – neurokinin a
  – neurokinin b
  – physalaemin
  – substance p
  – technetium tc 99m mertiatide
  – teprotide
  – tetragastrin
  – thymic factor, circulating
  – tuftsin
  – vasopressins
  – argipressin
  – deamino arginine vasopressin
  – felypressin
  – lypressin
  – ornipressin
  – oxytocin
  – vasotocin

– opioid peptides

  – dynorphins
  – endorphins
  – alpha-endorphin
  – beta-endorphin
  – gamma-endorphin
  – enkephalins
  – enkephalin, ala(2)-mephe(4)-gly(5)-
  – enkephalin, leucine
  – enkephalin, leucine-2-alanine
  – enkephalin, methionine
  – d-ala(2),mephe(4),met(0)-ol-enkephalin
  – enkephalin, d-penicillamine (2,5)-

– peptide fragments

– peptide hormones

  – activins
  – inhibin-beta subunits
  – adiponectin
  – atrial natriuretic factor
  – bombesin
  – calcitonin
  – corticotropin-releasing hormone
  – gastric inhibitory polypeptide
  – gastrins
  – glucagon precursors
  – enteroglucagons
  – glucagon-like peptide 1
  – glucagon
  – inhibins
  – inhibin-beta subunits
  – insulin
  – insulin, isophane
  – insulin, long-acting
  – proinsulin
  – c-peptide
  – leptin
  – motilin
  – msh release-inhibiting hormone
  – msh-releasing hormone
  – natriuretic peptide, c-type
  – pancreatic polypeptide
  – parathyroid hormone-related protein
  – parathyroid hormone
  – teriparatide
  – peptide phi
  – peptide yy
  – pituitary hormone release inhibiting hormones
  – pituitary hormone-releasing hormones
  – pituitary hormones
  – pituitary hormones, anterior
  – gonadotropins, pituitary
  – follicle stimulating hormone
  – follicle stimulating hormone, beta subunit
  – glycoprotein hormones, alpha subunit
  – luteinizing hormone
  – glycoprotein hormones, alpha subunit
  – luteinizing hormone, beta subunit
  – menotropins
  – urofollitropin
  – growth hormone
  – human growth hormone
  – prolactin
  – pro-opiomelanocortin
  – corticotropin
  – alpha-msh
  – cosyntropin
  – lipotropin
  – melanocyte-stimulating hormones
  – alpha-msh
  – beta-msh
  – gamma-msh
  – thyrotropin
  – glycoprotein hormones, alpha subunit
  – thyrotropin, beta subunit
  – pituitary hormones, posterior
  – oxytocin
  – vasopressins
  – argipressin
  – deamino arginine vasopressin
  – lypressin
  – felypressin
  – ornipressin
  – vasotocin
  – placental hormones
  – chorionic gonadotropin
  – chorionic gonadotropin, beta subunit, human
  – glycoprotein hormones, alpha subunit
  – gonadotropins, equine
  – placental lactogen
  – relaxin
  – resistin
  – secretin
  – somatostatin
  – thymosin
  – urotensins
  – vasoactive intestinal peptide

– peptide library

– peptides, cyclic

  – alamethicin
  – amanitins
  – bacitracin
  – capreomycin sulfate
  – cyclosporins
  – cyclosporine
  – cyclotides
  – dactinomycin
  – daptomycin
  – depsipeptides
  – valinomycin
  – echinomycin
  – ferrichrome
  – mycobacillin
  – nanotubes, peptide
  – nisin
  – octreotide
  – phalloidine
  – polymyxins
  – colistin
  – polymyxin b
  – streptogramins
  – mikamycin
  – pristinamycin
  – streptogramin group a
  – streptogramin a
  – streptogramin group b
  – streptogramin b
  – vernamycin b
  – virginiamycin
  – streptogramin a
  – thiostrepton
  – viomycin
  – enviomycin

– peptoids

  – n-substituted glycines

– phosphopeptides

– polygeline

– polyglutamic acid

– polylysine

– protein sorting signals

  – nuclear export signals
  – nuclear localization signals

– tissue polypeptide antigen

– tyrothricin

  – gramicidin
  – tyrocidine

The list continues at List of MeSH codes (D12.776).

D12.644